The Low Islands are one of the many uninhabited Canadian arctic island groups in Qikiqtaaluk Region, Nunavut. They are located in Ungava Bay, stretching between Young Island to the south and Lookout Island to the north.

References

External links 
 Low Islands in the Atlas of Canada - Toporama; Natural Resources Canada

Uninhabited islands of Qikiqtaaluk Region